Greatest Hits Vol II is the second compilation album by American country music artist Eddie Rabbitt. It was released in 1983 via Warner Bros. Records. The albums includes the singles "You Put the Beat in My Heart" and "Nothing Like Falling in Love"

Track listing

Chart performance

References

1983 compilation albums
Eddie Rabbitt albums
Albums produced by David Malloy
Warner Records compilation albums